Jacob Spencer Smith (born June 5, 1983) is an American former professional baseball catcher.

Smith attended East Carolina University, where he played for the East Carolina Pirates baseball team. He won the Johnny Bench Award as the top collegiate catcher in 2006.

Smith was drafted by the Oakland Athletics in the 21st round of the 2006 Major League Baseball Draft.

References

External links

1983 births
Living people
American expatriate baseball players in Canada
Arizona League Athletics players
Baseball catchers
East Carolina Pirates baseball players
Kane County Cougars players
Baseball players from Greensboro, North Carolina
Vancouver Canadians players